Feldmarschall Nicholas Taaffe, Graf von Taaffe, 6th Viscount Taaffe and 6th Baron of Ballymote (about 168530 December 1769), was an Irish-born courtier and soldier who served the Habsburgs in Lorraine and Austria.

The first mention of the Taaffe family name appeared in Irish annals in the year 1284. Their seat was Smarmore Castle, located in County Louth, since 1320. Born at Crean's Castle in County Sligo, and brought up as a Roman Catholic, Taaffe was the son of Francis Taaffe and Anna Maria Crean, and was a second cousin of the 5th Viscount Taaffe. He was educated in the Duchy of Lorraine and became the chancellor of Duke Leopold of Lorraine, father of the Holy Roman Emperor Francis I.

He entered the Habsburg Army, serving at Phillipsburg in Baden and in the campaign against France in 1734-5, the Turkish War of 1736-39, and was present in battle at Fort St. Elizabeth, Pallesch, and the Battle of Semlin. He succeeded to the peerage in 1738, and was promoted to Major-General (General Feldwachtmeister) in 1739. He also fought in the Silesian Wars against Prussia and distinguished himself, aged about 72, at Marshal Daun's victory of Frederick the Great at Kolin in 1757. He was Chamberlain to Emperor Charles VII and Empress Maria Theresa. He is said to have introduced the growing of the potato to Silesia in 1763.

Under the reign of Queen Anne he lost his Irish estates to a Protestant relative when they were claimed under the Act of 1703, leading to a lengthy lawsuit. After years, the case was ended by a compromise embodied in a private Act of Parliament, by which the estates were sold and one-third of the value given to Nicholas Taaffe. With the money, he acquired the castle of Ellischau (Nalžovy) in Bohemia; he had also inherited other property in the Habsburg dominions. He was naturalised in Bohemia, and in 1738 inherited the title of Viscount Taaffe from a cousin. He left on record that the reason for becoming an Austrian was that he did not wish his descendants to be exposed to the temptation of becoming Protestants, so as to avoid the operation of the Penal Laws.

Taaffe had a distinguished career in the Habsburg Army; he eventually rose to the rank of a Feldmarschall (Field Marshal), and was created ''Graf'' von Taaffe (Count of Taaffe) by the Empress Maria Theresa.

References

1685 births
1769 deaths
Counts of Austria
Viscounts Taaffe